Myers House may refer to:

 Myers House (Helena-West Helena, Arkansas)
 Socrates A. Myers House, Salmon, Idaho
 Witt-Champe-Myers House, Dublin, Indiana
 Stephen and Harriet Myers House, Albany, New York
 Myers-Hicks Place, Byhalia, Mississippi
John B. Myers House and Barn, Florissant, Missouri
 George J. Myers House, Kansas City, MO, listed on the NRHP in Missouri
 Myers-Masker House, Midland Park, New Jersey
 Myers-White House, Bethel, North Carolina
 Moses Myers House, administered by Chrysler Museum of Art, Norfolk, Virginia
 Tucker House and Myers House, Washington, D.C.
 Myers House (Martinsburg, West Virginia)

See also
Myer House (disambiguation)
Meyers House (disambiguation)
Meyer House (disambiguation)